Horisme aquata, the Cumbrian umber, is a moth of the family Geometridae. Jacob Hübner first used the scientific name in 1813. It is found in Europe, where it has been recorded from Spain, France, Belgium, the Netherlands, Germany, Denmark, Sweden, Switzerland, Austria, Italy, Slovenia, Poland, Hungary, Romania, Latvia, Lithuania and Ukraine, to Russia and China.

The wingspan is 15–27 mm.

The larvae feed on Pulsatilla species.

Subspecies
Horisme aquata aquata
Horisme aquata kansuensis Sheljuzhko 1955
Horisme aquata wanquana Yang, 1978

References

External links
"08409 Horisme aquata (Hübner, [1813]) - Küchenschellen-Waldrebenspanner". Lepiforum e.V. Retrieved February 6, 2020.

Moths described in 1813
Melanthiini
Moths of Europe
Taxa named by Jacob Hübner